Abu Zaid Abd-Arrahman Ibn Ali Salih al-Makudi (died in Fes, in 1405) was a grammarian from Morocco. His Sharh al Makudi, is a commentary to the Grammar Alfiyya of Ibn Malik, with the glosses of Almellewi printed in the margin. His commentary is of great value for the study of grammar.

References

Moroccan writers
Linguists from Morocco
Moroccan scholars
Year of birth unknown
1405 deaths
People from Fez, Morocco
14th-century Moroccan people
15th-century Moroccan people